Malaga is an unincorporated community in Chelan County, Washington, United States. Malaga has a post office with ZIP code 98828.

References

Unincorporated communities in Chelan County, Washington
Unincorporated communities in Washington (state)
Washington (state) populated places on the Columbia River